Röhrig is a surname. People include:

 Géza Röhrig (born 1967), Hungarian actor and poet
 Josef Röhrig (1925–2014), German footballer
 Udo Röhrig (born 1943), East German handball player
 Walter Röhrig (1897–1945), German art director
 Wolfram Röhrig (1916–1998), German jazz pianist, choral conductor, director of a broadcaster department, composer

surnames